The New York Apple Core are a Tier III Junior A ice hockey team from Brewster, New York, playing in the Eastern Hockey League. The team plays home games at the Brewster Ice Arena. The Apple Core organization is based out of Long Beach, New York, on Long Island, however, their top level junior team has played in Brewster since the start of the 2011–12 season.

The Apple Core organization also fields a Tier III team in the Eastern Hockey League-Premier Division, as well as youth hockey select teams at the Bantam, Peewee, and Squirt and other various levels.

History
The franchise was a full-time member of the Eastern Junior Hockey League (EJHL) from 1998 to 2013. The team was originally formed in 1993 in the Junior B Metro League.  In 1997–98, they played a handful of games against the EJHL, and became a full-time member a year later. In 2003, the Apple Core won the Triple Crown EJHL Championship, finishing as regular season and post-season champions. In 2013, the various Tier III junior hockey leagues in the north east went through a re-organization, which included the Apple Core joining the Atlantic Junior Hockey League. The Atlantic Junior Hockey League then re-branded itself as the Eastern Hockey League (EHL) after the dissolution of the former EJHL.

Since joining the EJHL in 1998, the organization has also fielded multiple Tier III Junior B/C teams in the Empire Junior Hockey League, Eastern States Hockey League, and Metropolitan Junior Hockey League, and the United States Premier Hockey League - Empire Division. In 2016, their developmental team (formerly known as Tier III Junior B/C) moved from the Metropolitan Junior Hockey League to the EHL's Elite Division (and then called Premier Division since 2017) and continues to play home games in Long Beach, New York.

Season-by-season records

Alumni
Apple Core has produced a number of alumni playing in higher levels of junior hockey, NCAA Division I and Division III, and ACHA college programs, and professional hockey, including:

 Anthony Bitetto - New York Rangers (NHL)
 Erik Burgdoerfer - Buffalo Sabres (NHL)
 Mark Eaton - Pittsburgh Penguins (NHL)
 Rich Hansen - Rapid City Rush (CHL)
 Mārtiņš Karsums - Dinamo Riga (KHL)
 Ryan Cruthers - Orlando Solar Bears (ECHL)
 Doug Murray - Montreal Canadiens (NHL)
 Eric Nystrom -  Nashville Predators (NHL) 
 Jekabs Redlihs - Dinamo Riga (KHL)	
 Steven Santini - St. Louis Blues (NHL)
 Kevin Schaeffer - Charlotte Checkers (ECHL)
 Rob Scuderi - Pittsburgh Penguins (NHL)
 Ryan Vesce - San Jose Sharks (NHL)
 Matt Gilroy - New York Rangers (NHL)

In 2005, the Apple Core became the first junior team to be represented by all four competing schools in the Beanpot hockey tournament. Representing the Apple Core were Kevin Schaeffer and Jekabs Redlihs of Boston University, Mike Brennan of Boston College, Jon Pelle and Bill Keenan of Harvard University, and Louie Liotti and Steve Birnstill of Northeastern University.

References

External links
 Apple Core Website

Ice hockey teams in New York (state)
Sports in Long Island